Forestville is an unincorporated community in Richland Township, Delaware County, Iowa, United States. The community was named after the forest in adjacent Backbone State Park, and lies two miles northeast of Dundee.

History
 
The first settler was William Turner, who built a sawmill in 1847; this sawmill was destroyed in a flood but was replaced with a new mill in 1851. Turner opened a store in 1850.

Forestville was platted in April 1854 in Section 22 of Richland Township by surveyor Joel Bailey for landowner Daniel Leonard. Although the plat occurred in 1854, the recording occurred on July 15, 1856.

In 1852, Charles Hall opened a tavern. That same year, a log cabin school was built; this building was replaced by a wooden frame school in 1854. In 1853, a grist mill was built near the sawmill. Hiram Wood established a creamery near Forestville in 1874, one of four in Richland Township.

In 1872, the Forestville School District was formed. By 1887, the community's population was 180.

The community's population declined over the years. In 1902, Forestville's population was 44,  and a 1914 history of Delaware County stated that by that time, only around 50 residents lived in Forestville.

References

Unincorporated communities in Delaware County, Iowa
Unincorporated communities in Iowa